Z. exigua may refer to:

 Zamarada exigua, a geometer moth
 Zignoëlla exigua, a sac fungus